The Bechle Apartment Building is a historic two-unit house at 1000 East 9th Street in Little Rock, Arkansas.  It is a -story brick structure, with a hip roof pierced by a single hip-roof dormer at its front.  The dormer has small windows laid out like a Palladian window, with Stick style decorative elements.  A shed roof porch extends across the building front, supported by Tuscan columns mounted on short brick piers.  The building was designed by Charles L. Thompson and was built in 1909.

The building was listed on the National Register of Historic Places in 1978.

See also
National Register of Historic Places listings in Little Rock, Arkansas

References

Houses on the National Register of Historic Places in Arkansas
Colonial Revival architecture in Arkansas
Houses completed in 1909
Houses in Little Rock, Arkansas
National Register of Historic Places in Little Rock, Arkansas